Hwp1 (Hyphal wall protein 1) is a protein (glycoprotein) located on the surface of an opportunistic diploid fungus called Candida albicans.

This "hyphal" denomination is due to Hwp1 appears exclusively on the surface of a projection called hyphae that emerges from the surface of this fungus.

Hwp1 is particularly important because it is a substrate of mammalian transglutaminase.

This transglutaminase ability has two implications, one (in fungus pathogenicity) proved, and the other (in food proteins potential pathogenicity) hypothetical.

Fungus pathogenicity 

Hwp1 has been proven to be involved in oral candidiasis. Candida albicans Hwp1 allows through the use of transglutaminase from the host (human beings, for example) to adhere to human epithelial cells with the strength of a covalent, isopeptide bond (the same strength in which human body proteins are built). This ability is highly related with Candida albicans being the prevalent Candida species in all types of candidiasis. Other candida species don't have the Hwp1 protein.

Hwp1 - Gluten molecular mimicry 
Hwp1 of Candida albicans shares similar sequence homology of amino acids with gliadin (α- and γ-gliadins) of gluten protein. This homology appears between fragments of hwp1 sequence and α-gliadin and γ-gliadin T-cell epitopes in celiac disease.

See also
 Adhesin molecule (immunoglobulin -like)
 Bacterial adhesin
 Cell adhesion
 Fungal adhesin

References 

Fungal proteins
Glycoproteins